Abdul Latif Al-Bulushi (born 4 November 1955) is an Omani sport shooter. He competed in the 1984 and 1988 Summer Olympics.

References

External links
 

1955 births
Living people
Shooters at the 1984 Summer Olympics
Shooters at the 1988 Summer Olympics
Omani male sport shooters
Olympic shooters of Oman